Claude Weisz is a French film director born in Paris.

Filmography

Feature films
 Une saison dans la vie d'Emmanuel (1972) with Germaine Montéro, Lucien Raimbourg, Florence Giorgetti, Jean-François Delacour, Hélène Darche, Manuel Pinto, etc.

Festival de Cannes 1973 - Quinzaine des réalisateurs

Jury Prize: Festival Jeune Cinéma 1973

 La Chanson du mal aimé (1981) with Rufus, Daniel Mesguich, Christine Boisson, Věra Galatíková, Mark Burns, Philippe Clévenot, Dominique Pinon, Madelon Violla, Paloma Matta, Béatrice Bruno, Catherine Belkhodja, Véronique Leblanc, Philippe Avron, Albert Delpy, etc.

Festival de Cannes 1982 - Perspectives du cinéma français

Competition selections: Valencia, Valladolid, Istanbul, Montréal

 On l'appelait... le Roi Laid (1987) with Yilmaz Güney (mockumentary)

Valencia Festival 1988 - Grand Prix for documentaries "Laurel Wreath"

Competition selections: Rotterdam, Valladolid, Strasbourg, Nyon, Cannes, Lyon, Cairo

 Paula et Paulette, ma mère (2005) Documentary - Straight to DVD

Short and mid-length

 La Grande Grève (1963 - Co-directed CAS collective, IDHEC)
 L'Inconnue (1966 - with Paloma Matta and Gérard Blain - Prix CNC Hyères, Sidney)
 Un village au Québec
 Montréal
 Deux aspects du Canada (1969)
 La Hongrie, vers quel socialisme ? (1975 - Nominated for best documentary - Césars 1976)
 Tibor Déry, portrait d'un écrivain hongrois (1977)
 L'huître boudeuse
 Ancienne maison Godin ou le familistère de Guise (1977)
 Passementiers et Rubaniers
 Le quinzième mois
 C'était la dernière année de ma vie (1984 - FIPRESCI Prize- Festival Oberhausen 1985 - Nomination - Césars 1986)
 Nous aimons tant le cinéma (Film of the European year of cinema - Delphes 1988)
 Participation jusqu'en 1978 à la réalisation de films "militants"

Television

 Series of seven dramas in German
 Numerous documentary and docu-soap type films (TVS CNDP)
 Initiation à la vie économique (TV series - RTS promotion)
 Contemplatives... et femmes (TF1 - 1976)
 Suzel Sabatier (FR3)
 Un autre Or Noir (FR3)
 Vivre en Géorgie
 Portrait d'une génération pour l'an 2000 (France 5 - 2000)
 Femmes de peine, femmes de coeur (FR3 - 2003)

Television documentaries

 La porte de Sarp est ouverte (1998)
 Une histoire balbynienne (2002)
 Tamara, une vie de Moscou à Port-au-Prince (unfinished)
 Hana et Khaman (unfinished)
 En compagnie d'Albert Memmi (unfinished)
 Le Lucernaire, une passion de théâtre
 Les quatre saisons de la Taillade ou une ferme l'autre
 Histoire du peuple kurde (in development)
 Les kurdes de Bourg-Lastic (2008)
 Réalisation de films institutionnels et industriels

References

External links 

 
La Cathode (Editeur of "Paula et Paulette, ma mère"]
k-films (Editeur of: "une saison dans la vie d'Emmanuel" DVD.
"Une histoire balbynienne" view online

French film directors
Living people
Year of birth missing (living people)